For the state pageant affiliated with Miss Teen USA, see Miss Vermont Teen USA

The Miss Vermont's Outstanding Teen competition is the pageant that selects the representative for the U.S. state of Vermont in the Miss America's Outstanding Teen pageant.

Abagail Hunter of Poultney was crowned Miss Vermont's Outstanding Teen on April 24, 2022 at the Chandler Center for the Arts in Randolph, Vermont. She competed for the title of Miss America's Outstanding Teen 2023 at the Hyatt Regency Dallas in Dallas, Texas on August 12, 2022.

Results summary 
The following is a visual summary of the past results of Miss Vermont's Outstanding Teen titleholders presented in the table below. The year in parentheses indicates year of the Miss America's Outstanding Teen competition in which the placement and/or award was garnered.

Awards

Other awards 
 Miss Photogenic: Alexina Federhen (2015)
 Non-finalist Interview Award: Caroline Bright (2008)

Winners

References

External links
 Official website

Vermont
Vermont culture
Women in Vermont